Odeonsplatz is an important U-Bahn interchange station on the northern edge of Munich's Old Town. It is one of the Old Town's principal U-Bahn interchanges, the others being Sendlinger Tor on the southern periphery, Karlsplatz in the west and Marienplatz in the city centre.

The station is also serviced by the Museumsline 100, a bus line that calls at several important museums throughout town. Moreover, the night service N40 calls at Odeonsplatz.

Places nearby
Clockwise, starting in the north
 Odeonsplatz
 Englischer Garten
 Haus der Kunst
 Bavarian State Chancellery
 Hofgarten
 Residenz
 Feldherrnhalle
 Theatinerkirche

See also
List of Munich U-Bahn stations

References

External links

Munich U-Bahn stations
Railway stations in Germany opened in 1971
1971 establishments in West Germany